is a comedy manga series written and illustrated by Keishū Ando. It was originally serialized in the Shueisha shōnen anthology magazine Weekly Shōnen Jump from 1992 to 1993. The series tells the tale of a young martial artist who transforms into a bizarre hero of justice by wearing a pair of panties on his head. A live action film adaptation titled Hentai Kamen was released in 2013. It was followed by a second film, Hentai Kamen: Abnormal Crisis, in 2016.

Plot 
Kyōsuke Shikijō is a high school student skilled in kenpō, but incompetent with girls to the point that his interaction with them gets him into painful situations. One day he saves a girl named Aiko Himeno from bullies and is immediately smitten with her.  When she is taken hostage by a group of criminals during a bank robbery, Kyōsuke is forced to take a disguise to save her without being recognized by the crooks after an earlier incident where he reveals himself on a megaphone. When he accidentally puts a pair of panties over his head instead of a normal mask he undergoes a transformation: due to the perverted genetics of his mother (an S&M worker), he is able to awaken the full potential of his body. Running out wearing nothing but the panties on his head and underpants covering his loins, Kyōsuke, now christening his masked self Hentai Kamen, uses his power and perversion to defeat the criminals and save Aiko.

Media

Manga 
Kyūkyoku!! Hentai Kamen was written and illustrated by Keishū Ando and serialized in Shueisha's magazine Weekly Shōnen Jump from 1992 to 1993. A total of six tankōbon (bound volumes) collecting the 52 chapters were released.

The series returned by way of School Rumble author Jin Kobayashi with the special one-shot  in the magazine Jump Square in February 2008. A one-shot manga titled  was published in the May issue of Jump Square to promote the live-action film.

Live-action films 

The original manga was adapted into a live action film in 2013. The DVD release of the live-action film will include an original Manga telling a side-story of the film. The trailer to the live action film was first teased at the end of Evangelion 3.0, but was set for release on April 13, 2013. Hentai Kamen was used in a 'movie manners' segment that was released in select theaters; it drew attention for its unique and interesting way of reminding patrons.

The movie was directed by Yūichi Fukuda, known for manga-based TV dramas like One Pound Gospel and Saru Lock. The cast includes Ryohei Suzuki as the protagonist Kyosuke and Fumika Shimizu as the lead girl. The theme song is "Emotions" by Man With A Mission and the insert theme song is "Blast" by Anthem.

It did not make Box Office Mojo's list on its first weekend, but attained 12th place for the second and third weeks of its theatrical run. On April 29, it was announced that the movie had grossed 100 million yen at the box office. Despite its small scale showing, the first week earnings were ten times better than projected box office expectations. The movie was originally planned to be  a direct-to-DVD release.

On July 18, 2013, the New York Asian Film Festival announced the film as their Audience Award winner and recipient of the Daniel A. Craft Award for Excellence in Action Cinema.

A second film, Hentai Kamen: Abnormal Crisis, was released in 2016.

References

External links 
 
Official live-action movie website 

1992 manga
Comedy anime and manga
Japanese superheroes
Manga adapted into films
Martial arts anime and manga
Shōnen manga
Shueisha manga
Shueisha franchises
Superheroes in anime and manga